Harry Potter: The Exhibition is a travelling exhibition based on the Harry Potter series of books and films, which features props, costumes, and other artefacts. The first iteration of the exhibition ran from April 2009 to March 2020. A second iteration of the exhibition is scheduled to premiere in early 2022.

First iteration (2009-2020)

Development
Warner Bros. Consumer Products, a division of Warner Bros. Entertainment Inc. (the studio which produced the film series), created the exhibition in partnership with Exhibitgroup/Giltspur (which later merged with GES Exposition Services).

Tour
The exhibition originally opened in April 2009 at the Museum of Science and Industry in Chicago, Illinois, United States. Following its premiere, the exhibition was shown at various localities around the world. The final exhibition of this iteration was at the Pavilhão de Portugal, in Lisbon, Portugal, which ended in March 2020 (earlier than scheduled due to the COVID-19 pandemic).

Features
The exhibition featured props, costumes, and other artefacts from the creation of the Harry Potter film series. Among the items displayed were Harry Potter's wand and eyeglasses. Also featured were film sets, such the Great Hall and Gryffindor Common Room from the fictional school Hogwarts, which is a major setting in the series. Beginning in 2016, some artefacts from the Fantastic Beasts and Where to Find Them film series were also included.

Second iteration (2022)

Development
As of 2021, Warner Bros., in partnership with Imagine Exhibitions and EMC Presents, are creating a new iteration of the exhibition. This new version will still highlight the Harry Potter and Fantastic Beasts series of books and films, and will also feature stories from the expanded Wizarding World, including Harry Potter and the Cursed Child. Visitors will be able to see authentic props and original costumes from the films and have the opportunity to engage with the exhibits.

Tour
The Franklin Institute in Philadelphia, Pennsylvania will host the world premiere of the exhibition in early 2022, which is slated to tour globally afterwards.

References

External links

Exhibitions